Horace G. “Pappy” Owens (born October 9, 1961) is an American basketball coach and former player who is an assistant coach for the Delaware State Hornets men's team.

Born in Philadelphia, Pennsylvania, he played for Dobbins Technical High School and was a McDonald's All-American in 1979. Owens played collegiately for the Rhode Island Rams, where he ranks seventh on the school's all-time scoring list. He was an honorable mention All-American and first team All-Atlantic 10 selection during his senior season. Owens was drafted by the New Jersey Nets as the 44th overall pick of the 1983 NBA draft. His rights were traded to the Philadelphia 76ers during training camp that year and he was one of the team's last preseason cuts. Owens never played in the National Basketball Association (NBA).

Owens worked as a juvenile probation officer for the City of Philadelphia for fourteen years. In 2004, he joined the La Salle Explorers as an assistant coach and served that role for fourteen years. In 2018, he shifted roles to become a special assistant to head coach Ashley Howard. Owens joined the Delaware State Hornets as an assistant coach in July 2021.

Owens was inducted into the Philadelphia Black Basketball Hall of Fame in 2019.

Career statistics

College

|-
| style="text-align:left;"| 1979–80
| style="text-align:left;"| Rhode Island
| 28 || – || 31.6 || .473 || – || .756 || 2.6 || 2.5 || .8 || .1 || 12.3
|-
| style="text-align:left;"| 1980–81
| style="text-align:left;"| Rhode Island
| 29 || 29 || 34.3 || .471 || – || .729 || 3.0 || 2.9 || 1.2 || .1 || 12.6
|-
| style="text-align:left;"| 1981–82
| style="text-align:left;"| Rhode Island
| 27 || 27 || 38.0 || .452 || – || .763 || 2.9 || 3.0 || .9 || .3 || 15.4
|-
| style="text-align:left;"| 1982–83
| style="text-align:left;"| Rhode Island
| 28 || 28 || 35.9 || .447 || – || .800 || 6.7 || 2.0 || 1.1 || .1 || 22.3
|- class="sortbottom"
| style="text-align:center;" colspan="2"| Career
| 112 || 84 || 34.9 || .458 || – || .763 || 3.8 || 2.6 || 1.0 || .2 || 15.6

References

External links
College statistics

1961 births
Living people
21st-century African-American people
African-American basketball coaches
African-American basketball players
American men's basketball coaches
American men's basketball players
Basketball coaches from Pennsylvania
Basketball players from Philadelphia
La Salle Explorers men's basketball coaches
McDonald's High School All-Americans
New Jersey Nets draft picks
Rhode Island Rams men's basketball players
Shooting guards
20th-century African-American sportspeople